Gjest Baardsen (1791 – 13 May 1849) was a Norwegian outlaw, jail-breaker, non-fiction writer, songwriter and memoirist. He was among the most notorious criminals in Norway in the 19th century.

Personal life
Baardsen was born in Sogndalsfjøra, the son of fisherman Baard Gjestsen Fjæren and Maritha Pedersdatter. His father died in 1793. Baardsen married Anne Elisabeth Reinche in 1848. His wife had two children with another man before the marriage.

Criminal life and literary career
Baardsen was arrested several times for theft, and became legendary for his many successful escapes. From 1827 he served a life sentence at Akershus Prison, where he started a career as writer. The first parts of his autobiography were published from 1835. He was held at Akershus for 18 years. After his release from prison in 1845 he earned his living as a songseller and bookseller, married and settled in Bergen. Among his songs is a song on fellow prisoner Ole Høiland's escape from Akershus (1839), and a song on Høiland's death, "" from 1849.

Legacy
The last part of Baardsen's autobiography, which covered his life after his release from prison, was published (posthumously) in 1869, and his full autobiography has been republished several times. A film based on Baardsen's life was made in 1939, directed by Tancred Ibsen. Alfred Maurstad played the title character. The film Gjest Baardsen was among most viewed Norwegian films from the 1930s. The song "", performed by Maurstad in the film, became very popular. His life has also been the basis for treatments in novels and plays, often based on his autobiography, in which he justified his crimes by claiming that he stole from the rich and wealthy and shared with the poor. Later research indicates that his own version is somewhat idealized. Baardsen's childhood home in Sogndalsfjøra has been preserved and prepared for use as a museum.

References

1791 births
1849 deaths
People from Sogndal
19th-century Norwegian criminals
Norwegian male criminals
Norwegian prisoners and detainees
Norwegian autobiographers
Norwegian songwriters
Escapees from Norwegian detention